Yousuf Kamal (born 29 May 1938), better known as Shakeel Yousuf, is a Pakistani actor best known for his roles in PTV drama serial Uncle Urfi (1972), as 'Mehboob Ahmed' in PTV's Aangan Terha (1984) and as Taimoor Ahmad in Ankahi (1982). He has also acted in a number of local films as well as the role of First Prime Minister of Pakistan, Liaqat Ali Khan along with Christopher Lee in the biographical English film detailing the life of founder of Pakistan Muhammad Ali Jinnah, Jamil Dehalvi's Jinnah (1998) AndTraffic serial for BBC Channel-4. He is also known for his philanthropic activities.

Early life
Shakeel and his family migrated from India to Karachi, Pakistan in 1952. He was born as Yusuf Kamal in Bhopal, British India.

He received his primary education from an English medium school in British India and in a French missionary school in India.

Career

Films
He made his debut in the film, Honehar in 1966.
 Josh-e-intiqaam (1968)
 Nakhuda (1968)
 Papi (1968)
 Zindagi (1968)
 Dastaan (1969)
 Insaan aur gadha (1973)
 Badal aur bijli (1973)
 Chahat (1973)
 Jeedar (1981)
 Traffic Movie – TV Serial (BBC Channel-4 )
 Jinnah (1998) as Liaquat Ali Khan
 Zeher-e-Ishq (2016)

Television
Television roles in the following TV dramas:
 Naya Raasta (1971), written by the famous Pakistani TV writer Hasina Moin, Shakeel's first TV play
 Honeymoon
 Tick Tock Company
 Mantorama
 Afshan
 She jee
 Zameen
 Doosri Aurat
 Aandhi
 Bulbulay
 Ankahi as (Taimoor Ahmad)
 Ghuroor
 Tum say mil kar
 Saaye
 Jab Jab Dil Miley
 Shehzori
 Happy Eid Mubarak:
 Chaudhween Ka Chand
 Colony 52
 Dhoop Mein Sawan
 Kothi No 156
 Bulbulay
 Qutubuddins
 Zair, Zabar, Pesh (1974)
 Naam Dar
 Ankahi
 Uraan
 Ishq Ki Inteha
 Ana (1984 TV series) (1984)
 The Castle: Aik Umeed
 Aroosa
 Chand Grehan
 Uraan
 Uncle Urfi (1972)
 Tapish
 Kohar
 Parchaiyan
 Kaghaz Ke Phool (2009) PTV
 Ankahi
 Aangan Terha (1989)
 Koi to Barish
 Dil Ko Manana Nahi Aya
 Aansoo (Cameo appearance)
 Umrao Jaan Ada (Cameo appearance)
 Meri Zaat Zarra-e-Benishan (Cameo appearance)
 Dil E Muztar
 Kankar
 Mujhe Khuda Pe Yaqeen Hai
 Phir Kab Milo Ge
 Tere Baghair
 Teri Chah Main
 Udaari
 Sila

Awards and legacy
 In recognition of his contributions to show business, he was awarded the Pride of Performance in 1992.
 Nominee: Best Actor Drama Series in a Supporting Role in The 1st Indus Drama Awards in 2005
Shakeel, in his 'one-man-show' 35-minutes-long stage performance in Karachi, in December 2012, says in the play, "War, war and more war only results in hunger and poverty." "At one point, he reminisces about a time when people were full of love, honesty and concern for each other." Many Pakistani TV and film celebrities including Fatima Surayya Bajia, Hasina Moin, Bushra Ansari and Anwar Maqsood Hameedi were in the audience to watch his performance.

See also 
 List of Lollywood actors

References

External links
 , Shakeel (listed under his birth name Yousuf Kamal on IMDb), Retrieved 27 Dec 2016
 http://www.citwf.com/person383863.htm, TV and film actor Shakeel on Complete Index To World Film (CITWF) website, Retrieved 27 Dec 2016

1938 births
Muhajir people
Pakistani male television actors
Living people
Recipients of the Pride of Performance
Hum Award winners
Male actors from Karachi
Pakistani male film actors